Black Is Beltza II: Ainhoa is a 2018 animated drama film directed by Fermin Muguruza from a screenplay by Muguruza, Isa Campo, and Harkaitz Cano. It is a follow-up to 2018 film Black Is Beltza.

Plot 
Set in the mid-1980s, against the backdrop of Cold War's last rales, the plot follows the plight of Bolivia-born and Cuba-raised Ainhoa in her journeys across the Basque Country (her father's homeland), Lebanon, Afghanistan, and Marseille.

Voice cast

Production 
The films if an BIB2 Ainhoa AIE, Talka Records, Draftoon, and Lagarto production. It had the participation of Basque Autonomous Community's EiTB and the support of Argentina's INCAA. A Spanish-Argentine co-production, it received  however no support from Spain's ICAA nor RTVE.

Release 
The film was presented at the 70th San Sebastián International Film Festival on 23 September 2023. It was released theatrically in Spain on 30 September 2022.

Reception 
Juan Pablo Cinelli of Página/12 considered that, limitations of the animation work notwithstanding, the film is "sufficiently expressive" so it can effectively fulfill its didactic purpose: "to give an account of the revolutionary causes active during the '80s".

Accolades 

|-
| align = "center" | 2023 || 37th Goya Awards || colspan = "2" | Best Animated Film ||  || 
|}

See also 
 List of Spanish films of 2022

References 

Films set in the 1980s
Spanish animated films
Argentine animated films
2020s Spanish films
2020s Argentine films
Spanish multilingual films
Argentine multilingual films
Cold War films
Basque-language films